RNA, U2 small nuclear 2 is a protein in humans that is encoded by the RNU2-2 pseudogene.

References

Further reading 

Genes on human chromosome 11